Heaven Is for Easy Girls is the debut album by Canadian indie pop band The Awkward Stage, released in 2006 on Mint Records.

Track listing
 The Morons Are Winning
 So Stupid, So Smart
 Heaven Is for Easy Girls
 Sad Girl Radio
 I Drive
 We're Going for a Ride
 T-Rexia Nervosa
 I Love You, Hipster Darling
 1000 Teenage Hearts
 Room Tone
 Circus Ends in Tears (Pachrymosa)
 West Van Girl

2006 albums
The Awkward Stage albums
Mint Records albums